Ball Club is an unincorporated community and census-designated place (CDP) in Itasca County, Minnesota, United States; located within the Leech Lake Indian Reservation. As of the 2010 census, its population was 342. Ball Club is located between Zemple and Bena.

The center of Ball Club is generally considered at the junction of U.S. Highway 2 and Itasca County Road 39.  Ball Club is located 21 miles west of Grand Rapids.

Ball Club received its name from a type of Native American lacrosse stick. The majority of the community is populated by Native Americans of the Leech Lake Band of Ojibwe.

Ball Club's small economy includes a general store and gas station. The community also includes two churches, a clinic, a Headstart office, a community center, a water tower, and a Cordell.

The Mississippi River surrounds Ball Club on both the East and West side of the community. The boundary line between Itasca and Cass counties is in the vicinity.

Rosanna Catherine Payne served as the postmistress for Ball Club; Payne served in the Minnesota House of Representatives from 1927 to 1932.

Demographics

References

 Rand McNally Road Atlas – 2007 edition – Minnesota entry
 Official State of Minnesota Highway Map – 2011/2012 edition
 Mn/DOT map of Itasca County – Sheet 2 – 2011 edition

Census-designated places in Itasca County, Minnesota
Census-designated places in Minnesota
Minnesota populated places on the Mississippi River